Trinity Lutheran College is an independent, Christian co-educational, preparatory, early learning, junior, middle and senior years' college in Ashmore, Gold Coast, Australia.

History 
In January 1981, Trinity Lutheran Primary School was opened by Eddie and Lila MacKenzie, Ben Stephan, Jack and Irene Strohmeyer. The school began with 75 students, with the first classes in the Trinity Lutheran Church Hall, Southport.

School structure

Campuses 
The Trinity Lutheran College is one college, divided into three schools across two campuses.  The Early Learning and Junior Year's campus is located around the corner from the main Ashmore Road Trinity Campus. The Junior Year campus runs from Prep to Year 5. The Middle Year campus is from Year 6 to Year 9, and the Senior Year campus is from Year 10 to 12.

Facilities and grounds 
Major facilities include a 700-seat Chapel/auditorium and a 150-seat Cultural Precinct. In recent years a purpose-built Middle School has been constructed, and the Junior Years' classrooms have undergone a major redevelopment. Trinity has more than 500 computers located across the college for staff and students to use. Trinity has its own onsite restaurant which is used for various functions throughout the year. The college has recently had two new buildings completed: a Multi-purpose Hall and Sports Centre and a Design Technology and Trade Training Centre.

School events

Arts 
A twilight concert is held every term as well as an annual Battle of the Bands competition in February, between the three competing houses. Trinity's productions are on a 4-year rotation, Year A – Musical Production, Year B – International Tour, Year C – Major Production (Large Scale Play for Actors), Year D – National Tour. They hold an Annual Christmas service.

Outdoor education 
All students participate in a multitude of sports such as swimming, triathlon, water polo, cross country, and athletics carnivals. Annual camp is offered to most grades such as Musical Camp and Band Camp.

Public events 
The annual College Fete is held on the first Saturday of August.

Pathways

OP 

Trinity offers the OP tertiary entrance rank system. This pathway returns an OP out of 1–25 based on grades in Year 12 and a QCS Test.

Vocational education 

Vocational Education – certificate courses, school based traineeships and apprenticeships.

International Baccalaureate 

Trinity is one of a few International Baccalaureate IB World Schools on the Gold Coast. The Junior Years' campus (Prep to Year 5) program uses the International Baccalaureate Primary Years Program.

Notable alumni

Vasos Alexandrou – acoustic engineer, Vipac
Maggie Naouri – actress
Rhys Thomas – neurosurgeon
Kelsey Wakefield – Olympic athlete, Australian Women's Water Polo Team
Hayden Whitworth – founder and CEO, Christian Media
Eduard Wittig – managing director at Goldman Sachs
John Zakos – technology entrepreneur and Greek-Australian businessman

References

External links 
 Trinity Lutheran College home page

Schools on the Gold Coast, Queensland
Private primary schools in Queensland
Educational institutions established in 1981
Lutheran schools in Australia
International Baccalaureate schools in Australia
High schools and secondary schools affiliated with the Lutheran Church
Private secondary schools in Queensland
Elementary and primary schools affiliated with the Lutheran Church
1981 establishments in Australia